Ocean Mushure (born 1 July 1985) is a Zimbabwean footballer who plays as a defender for Lusaka Dynamos and the Zimbabwe national team.

Career

Club
Mushure's first club was Monomotapa United, he spent two years in and around the first team before being loaned out in 2011 to Motor Action. Immediately after returning from Motor Action, Mushure was signed by Dynamos. Since joining Dynamos he has won six trophies in five seasons. He signed a new contract with Dynamos on 17 January 2017. In December 2018, Mushure joined Lusaka Dynamos of the Zambian Super League on a two-year contract.

International
Internationally, Mushure has won five caps for the Zimbabwe national team. His debut came in a 2014 FIFA World Cup qualifier versus Egypt. He made two further appearances in 2013 for Zimbabwe before waiting two years until appearing again, with his next call-up coming for a friendly against Lesotho. A year later, Mushure was selected by Zimbabwe for the 2016 African Nations Championship.

Career statistics

International
.

International goals
Scores and results list Zimbabwe's goal tally first.

Honours
Dynamos
Zimbabwe Premier Soccer League (4): 2011, 2012, 2013 2014
Mbada Diamonds Cup (2): 2011, 2012

References

External links
 

Living people
Zimbabwean footballers
Zimbabwe international footballers
Zimbabwe A' international footballers
2016 African Nations Championship players
1985 births
Place of birth missing (living people)
Association football defenders
Zimbabwean expatriate footballers
Expatriate footballers in Zambia
Zimbabwean expatriate sportspeople in Zambia
Lusaka Dynamos F.C. players